Dioxybenzone (benzophenone-8) is an organic compound used in sunscreen to block UVB and short-wave UVA (ultraviolet) rays. It is a derivative of benzophenone. It is a yellow powder with a melting point of 68 °C.  It is insoluble in water, but moderately soluble in ethanol and isopropanol.

References 

Phenols
Sunscreening agents
Phenol ethers
Benzophenones